Forbidden knowledge, which is different from secret knowledge, is used to describe forbidden books or other information to which access is restricted or deprecated for political or religious reasons. Forbidden knowledge is commonly not secret, rather a society or various institutions will use repressive mechanisms to either completely prevent the publication of information they find objectionable or dangerous (censorship), or failing that, to try to reduce the public's trust in such information (propaganda). Public repression can create paradoxical situation where the proscribed information is generally common knowledge but publicly citing it is disallowed.

A rich set of examples exist through history. 
 The Roman Catholic church forbids publication of books to which it has not granted Imprimatur.
Throughout the years of isolation in Japan and China all Western literature was forbidden. 
Certain 20th century regimes (e.g. communist nations in Eastern Europe and China) placed strong restrictions on foreign publications.
 In the United States, conservative groups including Jerry Falwell's Moral Majority made several attempts to censor pro civil-rights and feminist works such as Our Bodies, Ourselves.
In many cases this resulted in people defending themselves by creating political jokes. Jokes throughout history have been a powerful instrument to undermine state authority and the public truth associated with it.

Sociological and political relevance
 
Some form of public repression of facts or speculation not desirable to some people or even a majority of the population seems inevitable as societies need to create some common basis of facts to create a unified identity. Critical to political and personal freedom is the level to which this repression is organized through the state or powerful private organizations. Western secular societies have reached the consensus through the late 19th and early 20th centuries that private organizations should not be allowed to engage in compulsory censorship, forcing people to obey their dictates. For example, the separation of church and state in most Western societies mostly prevents religious organizations from repressing individuals based on their personal opinions and beliefs. As well, people are generally allowed to leave employment with a company which may regulate such personal expressions for whatever reason and find employment in less restrictive circumstances.

References

Further reading
Beckett, C (1989) Forbidden Knowledge, New Scientist 121(1649), 76.
Blatt, IB (1998) Freud and Forbidden Knowledge, Journal of Religion and Health 37(3), 290.
Johnson, DG (1999) Reframing the Question of Forbidden Knowledge for Modern Science, Science and Engineering Ethics 5(4), 445.
Hagendorff, T (2021) Forbidden knowledge in machine learning. Reflections on the limits of research and publication, AI & Society 3(36), 767.
Schrag, B et al. (2003) Forbidden Knowledge – A Case Study with Commentaries Exploring Ethical Issues and Genetic Research, Science and Engineering Ethics 9(3), 409.
Wendl, MC (2005) The Question of Forbidden Knowledge, Science 308(5728), 1549.
Kempner, J., Merz, J. F. and Bosk, C. L. (2011), Forbidden Knowledge: Public Controversy and the Production of Nonknowledge. Sociological Forum, 26: 475–500.  

Knowledge